Lanjew (meaning dark strip-field) is a farm in the parish of Withiel in Cornwall, England.

See also

 List of farms in Cornwall

References

Farms in Cornwall